Mosén Diego de Valera (1412–1488) was a Spanish nobleman, author, and historian who has been described as having had "chivalrous adventures" that took him "as far as Bohemia" where he was a participant in the Hussite Wars. He authored letters to Spanish Kings John II of Castile and Henry IV of Castile admonishing them to remember rulers who had been deposed for poor governance. He reminded the latter of various Old Testament kings who were chosen to rule, but were deposed nonetheless, and of thirteen Gothic kings who died at the hand of their vassals due to despotic government. Without necessarily approving rebellion and deposition, he implied that  such was the common fate of unworthy kings. His warning did not prevent King Henry IV from being deposed in 1465.

One treatise written by Valera, Espejo de verdadera nobleza (1439–41), challenged some of the preconceived notions concerning nobility. Valera argues in favor of "true nobility" based on virtue and education in place of the medieval concept of "blood" nobility, showing the influence of Renaissance humanism in the early decades of fifteenth-century Castile. He also wrote one of the first known books on fencing, Treatise on Arms, and a short history of Spain, the Crónica de España abreviada (1481), which itself relies on the Chronicle of 1344. His chronicle was used as the main source for the Crónica popular del Cid (1498).

Books
 Memorial de diversas hazana: Crónica De Enrique IV (published by Espasa Calpe, 1491)
 Espejo de verdadera nobleza (published by Atlas, 1959; ed. by Mario Penna)

Bibliography
 .

References

Spanish male writers
15th-century Spanish historians
1412 births
1488 deaths